Golden Gaytime (Cookie Crumble in New Zealand) is a popular ice cream snack that is made and distributed by the Streets confectionery company in Australia, and first released in 1959. It is a toffee and vanilla ice cream dipped in compound chocolate, and wrapped in vanilla biscuit-like "crumbs" on a wooden paddlepop-stick. Its name has survived intact regardless, or because, of the possible homosexual connotations in modern decades.

Variations
On 4 August 2015, Streets released Golden Gaytime ice-cream tub format in addition to its usual popsicle stick format, as well as selling a tub of the ice cream's crumbs on the side.
On 7 September 2016, Streets released the Golden Gaytime cross Cornetto cone – named Golden Gaynetto – in addition to other formats.
In 2017, Streets released a Golden Gaytime ice-cream sandwich named the Golden Gaytime Sanga ("Sanga" being Australian slang for sandwich). A rainbow variant was also created in support of the LGBT community in 2017.
In the summer of 2020, several locations in Melbourne and Sydney held pop-up stores that contained various exclusive crumb variations, ranging from vanilla crumb, musk sticks, strawberry hard candy, popping candy and edible glitter, to vanilla crumb, pretzel bits and salted caramel drizzle.

Gaytime has also collaborated with various other companies to release Gaytime-flavoured versions of their products, including Gaytime Krispy Kreme donuts, Gaytime Coco Pops, and various Gaytime dessert mixes made by Green's baking, including mousse, cake, brownies and brookies.

Flavours 
Various flavours have been introduced, especially in the mid-2010s onwards, with some exclusive to particular stores (Krispy Kreme doughnut flavoured Golden Gaytime was initially released exclusively in Australian 7-Eleven stores). A plant-based version suitable for vegans was introduced in September 2022.

Advertising 

The company appears to embrace the camp name by retaining the tagline from the 1980s, "It's hard to have a Gaytime on your own". The in-home boxes feature the words "4 delicious chances to have a gay time". Ads featuring the slogan also occasionally featured men who would accidentally get into risqué positions whilst trying to get a Gaytime. In 2009, Streets started re-airing a television commercial from the 1980s.

Cultural impact 
The double meaning of the name is highlighted in The Bedroom Philosopher song "Golden Gaytime".

In 2018, several Indonesians attempted to boycott Unilever over the product due to its name and the rainbow variant in 2017 that was released to support the LGBT community. Unilever Indonesia released a statement in support of the boycotters, but also pointing out that Gaytimes have never been sold in Indonesia.

In early 2021, an online petition to change the product's name to something "less offensive" gained traction on social media. However, it was met with backlash by the general public, and Streets has stated that they won't change the product's name. In the same year, the name of the product was criticised by a Muslim association in Malaysia.

See also
 Unilever
 Streets (ice cream)

References

Australian confectionery
Ice cream brands
Unilever brands
Australian brands